Hörður Haraldsson (11 September 1929 – 5 October 2010) was an Icelandic sprinter. He competed in the men's 100 metres at the 1952 Summer Olympics.

References

1929 births
2010 deaths
Athletes (track and field) at the 1952 Summer Olympics
Hordur Haraldsson
Hordur Haraldsson
Place of birth missing